The Giardino Botanico Alpino Valderia is a botanical garden and nature preserve located in the Parco Naturale Alpi Marittime, Corso Dante Livio Bianco 5, Valdieri, Province of Cuneo, Piedmont, Italy.

The garden was established in 1990, and currently contains about 450 species of which 26 are endemic to the Maritime Alps. Its collections include Caltha palustris, Epilobium alsinifolium, Galium tendae, Potentilla valderia, P. fruticosa, Saxifraga florulenta, S. stellaris, S. aizoides, Senecio balbisianus, Silene cordifolia, Viola argenteria, and Viola valderia.

See also 
 List of botanical gardens in Italy

References 
 Giardino Botanico Alpino Valderia
 BGCI entry
 Colori del Piemonte description (Italian)

Botanical gardens in Italy
Province of Cuneo
Gardens in Piedmont